An Clochán Liath, known in English as Dungloe or Dunglow, is a town in County Donegal, Ireland. It is the main town in The Rosses and the largest in the Donegal Gaeltacht. Dungloe developed as a town in the middle of the 18th century, and now serves as the administrative and retail centre for the west of County Donegal, and in particular The Rosses, with the only mainland secondary school for the area.

Name
There is a river at the bottom of the town and years ago the only crossing was over a grey granite slab lying in the riverbed, hence the Irish name of the town, An Clochán Liath, which means the grey stepping-stone. The bridge was built in 1782.

The name An Clochán Liath was formerly anglicised as Cloghanlea. The name Dungloe or Dunglow is believed to come from the Irish Dún gCloiche. This name came into common English usage in the later years of the 18th century when the monthly fair, formerly held at Dún gCloiche (five miles north of the nascent town) was transferred to An Clochán Liath. In time the name of the fair and that of the town were subsumed. Today, An Clochán Liath is the only officially recognised name of the town.

Irish language
The Comprehensive Linguistic Survey of the Gaeltacht (revised) found that only 21.4% of the population of the area spoke Irish on a daily basis.
Despite being officially within the Gaeltacht, Irish is not the everyday language of the majority of residents. Just over one-fifth of the population are daily Irish speakers. Nevertheless, there are Irish-speaking areas outside the town and Irish is to be heard regularly in the town.

Administration
Dungloe is home to the Dungloe District Court, which covers the west and south-west areas of County Donegal. There are a number of banks, a Garda station, Donegal County Council office, fire station, and a credit union located on the Main Street. Also, there are pubs, convenience stores, supermarkets, cafes, and restaurants. The town is the headquarters of The Rosses' indigenous supermarket chain, The Cope.

Tourism

The town attracts tourists during July and August when the annual Mary From Dungloe International Festival takes place. It was founded in the 1960s and it has attracted 'special guests' over the years including Daniel O'Donnell, Cliff Richard, Gay Byrne and Sharon Shannon. Dungloe Bay and its surrounding hills have also attracted tourists to Dungloe. There is also a festival dedicated to the socialist writer Peadar O'Donnell in Dungloe each autumn. A little to the north of the town is the site of the ancient church of Templecrone.

Transport
The town is serviced by a number of private bus companies, which provide a link to national Bus Éireann routes through Donegal Town, and to the north of the county and Derry. In 1903, the town was linked, through Dungloe railway station, to the Londonderry and Lough Swilly Railway. However, the station was closed on 3 June 1940 as part of a process that saw the closure of all railways in the county.

Religion and popular culture 

By the standards of a rural Gaeltacht area, Dungloe has a significant Protestant minority, many of whom are Presbyterian. This is a result of the Plantation of Ulster in the seventeenth century. However, the town has a large Catholic majority.

Dungloe is mentioned in FX series Sons of Anarchy as the source of the motorcycle club's weapons from the True IRA, a fictional representation of the Real IRA.

People
 Tony Boyle (born 1970) - All-Ireland winning Gaelic footballer
 Alexander Campbell (1833-1877) - American businessman
 Paddy "the Cope" Gallagher (1871-1966) - businessman
 John O'Donnell (1910-1954) - Gaelic footballer
 Peadar O'Donnell (1893-1986) - republican Marxist
 Adrian Sweeney (born 1976) - All-Star Gaelic footballer
 Goats Don't Shave, Irish folk group

See also
 List of towns and villages in the Republic of Ireland
 List of towns and villages in Northern Ireland

References

External links
Dungloe population stats 2006

Gaeltacht places in County Donegal
Gaeltacht towns and villages
The Rosses
Towns and villages in County Donegal